Passive Control is the third studio album recorded by Yonderboi. The album was released on 23 September 2011. After six years of hiatus, Yonderboi returned with a full-length studio album. The title is self-contradictory like the previous ones (Shallow and Profound and Splendid Isolation).

Track listing

Contributors

 Edward Ka-Spel - vocals (track 1)
 Doma Schrank - guitars (track 1, 2, 4, 7)
 Charlotte Brandi - vocals (track 3, 5, 6, 8, 10)
 Albert Markos - cello (track 11)

References

External links
 Passive Control at Mole Listening Pearls webpage

2011 albums
Yonderboi albums